Sefid Ab (also Romanized as Sefīd Āb; also known as Āsbū) is a village in Khvoresh Rostam-e Jonubi Rural District, Khvoresh Rostam District, Khalkhal County, Ardabil Province, Iran. At the 2006 census, its population was 344, in 80 families.

References 

Towns and villages in Khalkhal County